The Laniakea Supercluster (Hawaiian for "open skies" or "immense heaven") is the galaxy supercluster that is home to the Milky Way and approximately 100,000 other nearby galaxies. It was defined in September 2014, when a group of astronomers including R. Brent Tully of the University of Hawaiʻi, Hélène Courtois of the University of Lyon, Yehuda Hoffman of the Hebrew University of Jerusalem, and Daniel Pomarède of CEA Université Paris-Saclay published a new way of defining superclusters according to the relative velocities of galaxies. The new definition of the local supercluster subsumes the prior defined local supercluster, the Virgo Supercluster, as an appendage.

Follow-up studies suggest that the Laniakea Supercluster is not gravitationally bound; it will disperse rather than continue to maintain itself as an overdensity relative to surrounding areas.

Name 
The name  means 'immense heaven' in Hawaiian, . The name was suggested by Nawaʻa Napoleon, an associate professor of Hawaiian language at Kapiolani Community College. The name honors Polynesian navigators, who used knowledge of the heavens to navigate the Pacific Ocean.

Characteristics 
It has the approximate mass of 1017 solar masses, or 100,000 times that of our galaxy, which is almost the same as that of the Horologium Supercluster. It consists of four subparts, which were known previously as separate superclusters:

 Virgo Supercluster, the part in which the Milky Way resides.
 Hydra–Centaurus Supercluster
 the Great Attractor, Laniakea's central gravitational point near Norma
 Antlia Wall, known as Hydra Supercluster
 Centaurus Supercluster
 Pavo–Indus Supercluster
 Southern Supercluster, including Fornax Cluster (S373), Dorado and Eridanus clouds.

The most massive galaxy clusters of the Laniakea Supercluster are Virgo, Hydra, Centaurus, Abell 3565, Abell 3574, Abell 3521, Fornax, Eridanus and Norma. The entire supercluster consists of approximately 300 to 500 known galaxy clusters and groups. The real number may be much larger because some of these are traversing the Zone of Avoidance, an area of the sky that is partially obscured by gas and dust from the Milky Way galaxy, making them essentially undetectable.

Superclusters are some of the universe's largest structures and have boundaries that are difficult to define, especially from the inside. Within a given supercluster, most galaxy motions will be directed inward, toward the center of mass. In the case of Laniakea, this gravitational focal point is called the Great Attractor, and influences the motions of the Local Group of galaxies, where the Milky Way galaxy resides, and all others throughout the supercluster. Unlike its constituent clusters, Laniakea is not gravitationally bound and is projected to be torn apart by dark energy.

Although the confirmation of the existence of the Laniakea Supercluster emerged in 2014, early studies in the 1980s already suggested that several of the superclusters then known might be connected. For example, South African astronomer Tony Fairall stated in 1988 that redshifts suggested that the Virgo and Hydra–Centaurus superclusters may be connected.

Location 
The neighboring superclusters to the Laniakea Supercluster are the Shapley Supercluster, Hercules Supercluster, Coma Supercluster and Perseus–Pisces Supercluster. The edges of the superclusters and Laniakea were not clearly known at the time of Laniakea's definition. Since then, the study of the edges of the supercluster and of structures beyond them has substantially improved.

Laniakea is itself a constituent part of the Pisces–Cetus Supercluster Complex, a galaxy filament.

See also 

 Dipole repeller
 Galaxy cluster
 Galaxy filament
 Illustris project
 Local Void – nearest neighboring void
 Supercluster
 Void (astronomy)

References

Further reading 
 
 Meet Laniakea, Our Home Supercluster

External links 

  Vimeo, "Laniakea Supercluster", Daniel Pomarède, 4 September 2014—video representation of the findings of the discovery paper
  YouTube, "Laniakea: Our Home Supercluster", Nature Video, 3 September 2014—Redrawing the boundaries of the cosmic map, they redefine our home supercluster and name it Laniakea.

 
201409??
Galaxy superclusters